The Pirre bush tanager (Chlorospingus inornatus) is a species of bird traditionally placed in the family Thraupidae, but now viewed closer to Arremonops in the Passerellidae. It is endemic to Panama. Its natural habitat is subtropical or tropical moist montane forests.

References

Pirre bush tanager
Endemic birds of Panama
Pirre bush tanager
Taxonomy articles created by Polbot